The International Textile and Garment Workers' Federation (ITGWF) was a global union federation of unions representing workers involved in manufacturing clothing and other textiles.

The federation was established on 17 June 1960 at conference in Copenhagen, when the International Federation of Textile Workers' Associations (IFTWA) merged with the International Garment Workers' Federation (IGWF).

The federation was led by general secretary Jack Greenhalgh, formerly leader of the IFTWA, president John Newton, formerly leader of the IGWF, and vice-president Alphonse Baeyens.

On 5 June 1970, at a conference in Folkestone in England, the federation merged with the International Shoe and Leather Workers' Federation to form the International Textile, Garment and Leather Workers' Federation.

Affiliates
In 1960, the following unions were affiliated to the federation:

References

Textile and clothing trade unions
Trade unions established in 1960
Trade unions disestablished in 1970